Bardeh Rash-e Tabriz Khatun (also Romanized as Bardeh Rash-e Tabrīz Khātūn; also known as Bardarash, Bardeh Rash, Bardeh Rasheh Yangī Arakh, and Bardrash) is a village in Chehel Cheshmeh Rural District, in the Central District of Divandarreh County, Kurdistan Province, Iran. At the 2006 census, its population was 128, in 21 families. The village is populated by Kurds.

References 

Towns and villages in Divandarreh County
Kurdish settlements in Kurdistan Province